Rosson is a surname. Notable people with the surname include:

Helene Rosson, American silent film actress
Queenie Rosson, American silent film actress

 Richard Rosson, American film director and actor

See also
Rosson House